"We Are Tonight" is a song written by Marc Beeson, Sam Hunt, and Josh Osborne and recorded by American country music singer Billy Currington. It was released in November 2013 as the second single from Currington’s 2013 album We Are Tonight.

The song became Currington's eighth number one hit on the U.S. Billboard Country Airplay chart. It also charted at numbers 12 and 60 on both the Hot Country Songs and Billboard Hot 100 charts respectively. The song was certified gold by the Recording Industry Association of America (RIAA), and it has sold 455,000 copies in the United States as of August 2014. It achieved similar chart success in Canada, peaking at number 17 on the Canada Country chart and number 87 on the Canadian Hot 100 chart.

The accompanying music video for the song was directed by Kristin Barlowe. One of the song's writers, Sam Hunt, recorded an acoustic version of the track for his 2013 mixtape Between the Pines.

Critical reception
The song received a favorable review from Taste of Country, which said that Currington's "emphatic, soulful style allows the title track from his new album to become a refreshing, anthemic party song that will still sound good sober." It also stated that "sharp, descriptive lyrics add color to each verse before a powerful chorus becomes the song’s signature moment."

Music video
The music video was directed by Kristin Barlowe and premiered in September 2013. It was filmed at the DeKalb County Fairgrounds in Alexandria, Tennessee.

Chart performance
"We Are Tonight" debuted at number 53 on the U.S. Billboard Country Airplay chart for the week of December 7, 2013. It also debuted at number 49 on the U.S. Billboard Hot Country Songs chart for the week of January 18, 2014. The song has sold 455,000 copies in the U.S. as of August 2014.

The song debuted at number 97 on the Canadian Hot 100 chart for the week of July 5, 2014.

Year-end charts

Certifications

References

2013 songs
2013 singles
Billy Currington songs
Sam Hunt songs
Mercury Nashville singles
Song recordings produced by Dann Huff
Songs written by Marc Beeson
Songs written by Sam Hunt
Songs written by Josh Osborne